Wayne Township is one of twenty townships in Allen County, Indiana, United States. As of the 2010 census, its population was 103,803.

History
The Horney Robinson House was listed on the National Register of Historic Places in 1985.

Geography

Cities and towns
 Fort Wayne (southwest portion)

Adjacent townships
The township is adjacent to these Indiana townships:
 Aboite (west)
 Adams (east)
 Lafayette (southwest)
 Lake (northwest)
 Marion (southeast)
 Pleasant (south)
 St. Joseph (northeast)
 Washington (north)

Major highways

Cemeteries
The township contains three cemeteries: Lindenwood, Prairie Grove, and Saint Johns.

References
 United States Census Bureau cartographic boundary files
 U.S. Board on Geographic Names

External links
 Wayne Township Trustee Office

Townships in Allen County, Indiana
Fort Wayne, IN Metropolitan Statistical Area
Townships in Indiana